Joyeuse is the name of Charlemagne's sword and is the French word for "joyous".

Joyeuse may also refer to:

Joyeuse (river), a river in France
Joyeuse, Ardèche, a town in the French department of Ardèche
See also List of Dukes of Joyeuse

People with the surname
René Joyeuse (1920–2012), French and American soldier, physician and researcher